Andrew Mishkin (born c. 1958, in Los Angeles) is a senior systems engineer at the Jet Propulsion Laboratory, where he coordinated the development of various robotic vehicles and their subsystems for more than 15 years. He was on the Sojourner rover team at its formation, eventually leading the team and commanding the rover during its exploration of Mars. In 1997 he received the NASA Exceptional Achievement Medal and was also selected as one of "The 35 People Who Made the Year" in the December issue of Vanity Fair magazine. He then was a Mission Operations System Development Manager on Mars Exploration Rover mission.

He grew up in West Los Angeles, graduated from University High School (Los Angeles, California), and then obtained a BS degree in Systems Engineering (man/machine systems) and an MS in Engineering (problem solving and decision making) from UCLA. He is a member of Sigma Xi, Tau Beta Pi and Phi Beta Kappa.

His wife, Sharon, is also an MER Systems Engineer.

Bibliography

References

External links
 AN AUTOMATED ROVER COMMAND GENERATION PROTOTYPE FOR THE MARS 2003 MARIE CURIE ROVER, 2003, NASA Technical Reports Server
 A Tool for Autonomous Ground-based Rover Planning, 2001, NASA Technical Reports Server
 From prime to extended mission : evolution of the Mars Exploration Rover tactical uplink process, 2006, NASA 
Technical Reports Server
Application of state analysis and goal-based operations to a MER mission scenario, 2006, NASA Technical Reports Server
Implementing distributed operations: a comparison of two Deep Space Missions, 2006, NASA Technical Reports Server
Mars Exploration Rover (MER) surface mission tactical uplink concepts, processes, and tools, 2002, NASA Technical Reports Server
Autonomously generating operations sequences for a Mars Rover using AI-based planning, 2001, NASA Technical Reports Server
Making tracks on Mars : mission operations for deep space, 2006, NASA Technical Reports Server
Application of state analysis and goal-based operations to a MER mission scenario, 2006, NASA Technical Reports Server

1958 births
American aerospace engineers
American technology writers
Living people
NASA people
People from Los Angeles
University High School (Los Angeles) alumni
Systems engineers
UCLA Henry Samueli School of Engineering and Applied Science alumni
Engineers from California